Kwon Ji-an (born 30 September 1983), commonly known by her stage name Solbi, is a South Korean singer, painter, and television personality. She made her singing debut in 2006 as a member of the K-pop group Typhoon, and gained widespread fame in 2008 as a cast member of the variety show We Got Married. She held her first solo exhibition as a painter in 2012.

Career

Debut

She made her debut as the main vocalist of the representative K-pop hybrid group Typhoon in 2006 and also released her solo album ' Do It ' in 2008. In the same year, she also received attention in plays and musicals. Since then, she has been releasing music and music albums every year.

Aside from her music career, Solbi has also achieved fame as a television host on MBC, in the shows Sang Sang Plus (season 2) (alongside Lee Hyori and Shin Jung-hwan) and Music Core with Big Bang members Seung Ri and Dae Sung from March 2008 to March 2009, later replaced by Tiffany and Yuri of Girls' Generation. In February 2008, Solbi was cast in the reality show We Got Married, where celebrities are paired up to live together as newlyweds.  Solbi was paired up with Hong Kyeong Min for the Lunar Special episode, but for the rest of the series her partner was Andy of Shinhwa.

On 19 June 2008 Solbi released her first solo digital single, titled 'Cute Love', the lyrics in which she composed herself.  The song is used as Andy and Solbi's theme song for the show. On 15 July 2008 she recorded a Korean version of 'Way Back into Love' from the 2007 movie Music and Lyrics with Kim Jong Wook. Solbi's first mini album titled 'Do It, Do It' was released on 17 September 2008.  Her second album, titled 'French Kiss' was released on 16 April 2009.

Solbi appeared as one of the main MCs for Infinite Girls (season 2), but later stepped down, citing scheduling conflicts with her upcoming album. She participated program named Infinite Challenge in October 2015.

In 2017, she was appointed as an ambassador for the Central Election Commission. She was also a special guest teacher in Idol School, as a Psychological Health Management teacher using art therapy, the same outlet for herself when she was struggling.

A change from singer to artist

She is absorbed in art, which was started in 2010 for healing purposes. Starting with ' fantasy ' of ' Trace ' in 2015, she introduced self-collaboration (a new form of art through collaboration between two different selves: Kwon Ji-an and Solbi). The self-collaboration is a total of five pieces, including 'Black Swan' in 2016, "Jikji Korea International Festival' in 2017, and 'Hyperism-Blue' in 2018. Solbi in particular is a side effect of the " hyperism " (the flood of information and content), which means that if modern desires and higher expectations are not addressed, the opposite side effect is the feeling of deprivation. 'Hyperism -Red' performed an unprecedented 'Red' performance on KBS 2 TV 'Music Bank ' on the subject of pains of women, giving fresh shock. In March 2018, she introduced the sound of 'Class' of 'Hyperism-Blue' to her YouTube channel.

In July 2022 Solbi will hold her tenth solo exhibition. 'Humming-Paradise' at Vista Walkerhill Hotel in Gwangjang-dong, Gwangjin-gu, Seoul from July 13 to September 13.

In August 2022, Solbi will hold the exhibition 'Beyond the Apple: Systemized Language' by Kwon Ji-an from August 20 to September 18.

Social contribution activities

She is also continuing her social contribution. Since 2012, she has been leading the sharing of talent donations and good deeds to a nursery in Gyeonggi Province. In 2016, she also released "Find," a song that was released by introducing 'Finding Project' to promote the search for missing children. In December of the same year, the company released 'Son Mo-ah gloves' to improve negative perception toward the deaf and speech impaired children and help them enjoy healthy daily lives. In 2017, she participated in 'A Night of Support for Multicultural Children' and donated 5 million won along with a special performance. She is also raising her voice towards social issues. Since 2014, Solbi has continued to paint pictures of the victims' of Sewol Ferry accident and expressed special condolences. In addition, she appeared as a lecturer on EBS special New Year's Special Talk for the Future of the Year in January 2018, pointing out that the punishment for stalking is only 100,000 won. The bill proposed by Solbi was decided as a comprehensive measure to prevent damage from stalking and dating violence at the National Assembly presided over by Prime Minister Lee Nak-yeon and was enacted as a 'law to punish stalking.' Solbi also criticized class society by releasing 'Class' of 'Hyperism-Blue' in 2018. In June 2018, she participated in the Muko Multi-Particular Anti-Terruption Event Association and encouraged families.

Children's arts education

In June 2018, she was selected as MC of Play-learn TV's 'Museum of Fine Arts of Roman Princess. 'Solbi has shown that she likes children through broadcasting and SNS. She taught art to children through volunteer work every year. Solbi challenges the realm of children's art, which became part of her art for healing purposes. As a result, 'The Museum of Fine Arts' is an unprecedented art program and children's education program that learns creative expression through experience in, listening and touching based on modern art.

Philanthropy 
On March 8, 2022, Solbi donated  million to the Hope Bridge Disaster Relief Association to help those affected by the massive wildfires that started in Uljin, Gyeongbuk. and also spread to Samcheok, Gangwon.

In May 2022, Solbi donated 10 million won to the orphanage on Children's Day and Mother's Day By donating on 29 April 2022.

Television appearances

 Golf Match Swing Star - Contestant (2023) 
 Show Music Core
 We Got Married (Season 1), MBC, 2008
 Sunday Sunday Night – We Got Married, MBC, 2008
 Sang Sang Plus (Season 2), KBS, 2008
 Infinite Girls (Season 2), MBC, 2009–2010
 Law of the Jungle Episode 247-251, 2017

Discography

Extended plays

Singles 
 Cute Love (digital single)
 Do It
 Always Together
 부탁해요 (Please) (narration, with AWESOME!)
 White Kiss
 Love Escort
 벌 받을 거야 (Punished)
 어쩌죠 (What Should I Do?)
 오뚜기 (Ottogi)
 오늘도 난 원더풀 (Wonderful As Always)
 블랙스완 (Black Swan)
 Get Back
 파인드(Find)
 너는 어때
 하이퍼리즘-레드(Hyperism-Red)
 하이퍼리즘-블루(Hyperism-Blue)
Angel

References

External links
 

1983 births
Living people
South Korean women pop singers
IHQ (company) artists
K-pop singers
21st-century South Korean women singers
South Korean painters